Brian Dowling may refer to:

 Brian Dowling (presenter) (born 1978), Irish television presenter
 Brian Dowling (American football) (born 1947), American football player
 Brian Dowling (hurler) (born 1983), Irish hurler